Gerald Raymond Bosch (born 12 May 1949) is a former South African rugby union player.

Playing career
Bosch played his provincial rugby for Transvaal and made his debut for the union in 1972. During his career with Transvaal he scored 521 points in Currie Cup matches and 896 points in all provincial matches.

He made his test debut for the Springboks on 22 June 1974 at Loftus Versfeld in Pretoria, in the second test against the touring British Lions team captained by Willie John McBride. Bosch scored 9 points in the match but was dropped from the team for the remaining matches in the series. He returned to the side for the Springboks' tour to France at the end of 1974 and played in both test matches as well as in five tour matches.

In 1975 Bosch once again played in both test matches against the touring French team and set a South African record by scoring 22 points in a test match during the second test on 28 June 1975 at Loftus Versfeld. His record was only equaled by Gavin Johnson in 1993 and again by Joel Stransky, later during 1993. Johnson improved the record to 28 point in a test against Western Samoa in 1995. In 1976 he played in all four test matches against the touring All Blacks, captained by Andy Leslie. Bosch scored a total of 89 points in his 9 test matches and a further 43 point in tour matches.

Test history 

Legend: pen = penalty (3 pts.); conv = conversion (2 pts.), drop = drop kick (3 pts.).

Accolades
In 1972, Bosch was one of the five Young Players of the Year, along with Paul Bayvel, Pikkie du Toit, Dugald MacDonald and Jackie Snyman.

See also
List of South Africa national rugby union players – Springbok no. 467

References

1949 births
Living people
South African rugby union players
South Africa international rugby union players
People from Vereeniging
Rugby union players from Gauteng
Rugby union fly-halves
Golden Lions players